Linscott is an unincorporated community in Blaine County, Nebraska, United States.

History
A post office was established at Linscott in 1887, and remained in operation until it was discontinued in 1921.

References

Unincorporated communities in Blaine County, Nebraska
Unincorporated communities in Nebraska